The following is a list of presidents of the news division for the American Broadcasting Company television network.

References

ABC News people
Presidents of ABC News
American Broadcasting Company executives